Retrospective is a compilation of the Indigo Girls (Emily Saliers & Amy Ray) work from 1987 to 1999.

Critical reception

William Ruhlmann of AllMusic writes, "It remains possible that the Indigo Girls will continue to score good, consistent sales, and the two new songs suggest that there's still creative fuel for this group to burn. But if they have crested, Retrospective confirms their status as one of the most accomplished recording units of their time."

Michael Hubbard of musicOMH writes, "Retrospective is an album which brings together many great moments from their years of non-hits"

Track listing

Musicians

Track 1: Strange Fire
Vocals: Amy Ray & Emily Saliers
Guitar: Amy Ray
Lead Guitar: Emily Saliers

Track 2: Closer to Fine
Vocals & Guitars: Amy Ray & Emily Saliers
Mandolin: Peter O'Toole
Tin Whistle: Fiachna O'Braondin
Bodhran: Liam Ó Maonlaí
Background Vocals: Peter O'Toole, Fiachna O'Braondin, Liam Ó Maonlaí, Luka Bloom
Percussion: Paulinho da Costa

Track 3: Kid Fears
Vocals & Guitars: Amy Ray & Emily Saliers
12 String Electric Guitar: John Keane
Bass: DeDe Vogt
Drums: Jay Dee Daugherty
Percussion: Paulinho da Costa
Additional vocals : Michael Stipe

Track 4: Watershed
Vocals & Acoustic Guitars: Amy Ray & Emily Saliers
Electric Guitar: John Jennings
Bass: Sara Lee
Drums: Kenny Aronoff
Percussion: Paulinho da Costa
Keyboards: Peter Holsapple

Track 5: Three Hits
Vocals & Acoustic Guitars: Amy Ray & Emily Saliers
Lead Guitar: Emily Saliers
Bass: Sara Lee
Drums & Percussion: Budgie
Fiddle: Lisa Germano
Uilleann pipes: Ronan Browne
Bouzouki & Bodhran: Dónal Lunny

Track 6: Galileo
Vocals & Acoustic Guitars: Amy Ray & Emily Saliers
Lead Guitar: Emily Saliers
Bass: Sara Lee
Drums, Percussion & Piano: Jerry Marotta
Percussion: Talvin Singh
Fiddle: Lisa Germano

Track 7: Ghost
Vocals & Acoustic Guitars: Amy Ray & Emily Saliers
Bass: Sara Lee
Electric Guitar: John Jennings
Drums & Percussion: Jerry Marotta
Cymbals & Sidestick: Simone Simonton
Piano: Jai Winding
Strings conducted & arranged by Michael Kamen

Track 8: Reunion
Vocals & Acoustic Guitars: Amy Ray
Vocals, Lead & Acoustic Guitar & Bouzouki: Emily Saliers
Drums: Jerry Marotta
Bass: Sara Lee
Acoustic Bass: Danny Thompson
Violin & Mandolin: Lisa Germano
Backing Vocals: Michael Lorant & The Roches

Track 9: Power of Two
Vocals, Rhythm & Lead Acoustic Guitar: Emily Saliers
Vocals & Acoustic Guitar: Amy Ray
Drums & Percussion: Jerry Marotta
Bass: Sara Lee
Acoustic Bass: Danny Thompson
Mandolin: Lisa Germano
Flugelhorn: John Painter
Chromatic Harmonica: Bill Newton
Piano: Chuck Leavell
Backing Vocals: Sam "Shake" Anderson

Track 10: Least Complicated
Vocals & Acoustic Guitars: Amy Ray & Emily Saliers
Drums, Bongos & Percussion: Jerry Marotta
Bass: Sara Lee
Penny Whistle & Mandolin: Lisa Germano
Accordion: John Painter & Jo-El Sonnier
Backing Vocals: Michael Lorant

Track 11: Shame on You
Vocals, Electric & Acoustic Guitars: Amy Ray
Vocals, Electric Guitar, Banjo & Bouzouki: Emily Saliers
Bass: Sara Lee
Drums, Percussion & Taos Drum: Jerry Marotta
Vocals & Harmonica: Steve Earle

Track 12: Get Out the Map
Vocals, Background Vocals, Banjo, Acoustic Guitar, Bouzouki: Emily Saliers
Vocals, Mandolin & Bouzouki: Amy Ray
Bass: Sara Lee
Drums, Percussion & Flintstone: Jerry Marotta
Backing Vocals: Dallas Austin; Quentin Bush & Jama Carter

Track 13: Go
Vocals, Electric & Acoustic Guitars: Amy Ray
Vocals & Electric Guitar: Emily Saliers
Drums: John Reynolds
Percussion: Dawson Miller
Bass: Clare Kenny
Organ & Moog: Carol Isaacs
Cello: Caroline Dale
Backin Vocals: Joan Osborne
Spoken Word written by Meridel LeSueur from I Was Marching

Track 14: Trouble
Vocals & Electric Guitar: Emily Saliers
Vocals & Mandolin: Amy Ray
Drums & Percussion: John Reynolds
Bass: Claire Kenny
Backin Vocals: Joan Osborne
Beat Box: Malcolm Burn

Track 15: Devotion
Vocals & Acoustic Guitar: Amy Ray
Vocals & Classical Guitar: Emily Saliers
Accordion: Carol Isaacs
Drums & Percussion: Jerry Marotta
Bass: Claire Kenny

Track 16: Leaving
Vocals & Guitars: Amy Ray & Emily Saliers
Organ & Organ: Carol Isaacs
Drums: Blair Cunningham
Bass: Claire Kenny

Production

Producer: John Keane (1), Indigo Girls (11-16), John Reynolds (13-16), Peter Collins (5-10), Scott Litt (2-4)
Package design: Kris Anderson-Barrett
Engineer: Tim Oliver (15, 16)
Liner Notes: Amy Ray, Emily Saliers, Susan Faludi
Mastered by: Scott Hull (15, 16)
Photography: Amy Ray, Gail Gellman, Giacomo Buonofina, Larry Ray, Lee Walker, Nelda Mays, Peter Buck, Roger Klein, Susan Alzmer

All track information and credits were taken from the CD liner notes.

References

External links
Indigo Girls Official Site
Epic Records Official Site

2000 compilation albums
Indigo Girls compilation albums
Epic Records compilation albums